This is a list of different floppy disk formats.

IBM 8-inch formats
This is a list of 8-inch floppy diskette formats as introduced by IBM.

DEC 8-inch formats
Digital Equipment Corporation used the following formats on 8-inch disks:

Other manufacturers

Physical composition

Logical formats 
Throughout the 1970s and 1980s, many different logical disk formats were used, depending on the hardware platform.

Ref. 

https://www.trs-80.com/wordpress/trs-80-computer-line/model-i/

https://www.trs-80.com/wordpress/trs-80-computer-line/model-ii/

https://www.trs-80.com/wordpress/trs-80-computer-line/model-4/

See also
 Zip drive (floppy-like, but incompatible medium using different technology)
 PocketZip (floppy-like, but incompatible medium using different technology)
 SuperDisk (floppy-like with drives also compatible with 3.5" floppy disks)

Notes

References

External links

 Floppy Disk Formats at the Museum of Obsolete Media

Legacy hardware
Floppy disk computer storage